The Volunteers Act 1782 established military regulations for the many part-time units that were raised in Britain during the American War of Independence.

External links
The full text of the Act is available online.

Great Britain Acts of Parliament 1782